Enrico Kühn (born 10 March 1977 in Bad Langensalza) is a German bobsledder who has competed since 1995. At the 2002 Winter Olympics in Salt Lake City, he won a gold medal in the four-man event with teammates Kevin Kuske, André Lange and Carsten Embach.

Kühn also won a silver medal in the four-man event at the 2004 FIBT World Championships in Königssee.

References
Bobsleigh four-man Olympic medalists for 1924, 1932-56, and since 1964
Bobsleigh four-man world championship medalists since 1930
DatabaseOlympics.com profile
FIBT profile (As Enrico Kuehn)

1977 births
Living people
People from Bad Langensalza
German male bobsledders
Bobsledders at the 2002 Winter Olympics
Olympic bobsledders of Germany
Olympic gold medalists for Germany
Olympic medalists in bobsleigh
Medalists at the 2002 Winter Olympics
Sportspeople from Thuringia